Diminutive Mysteries (Mostly Hemphill) is an album by saxophonist Tim Berne which was recorded in 1992 and released on the JMT label. The album is a tribute to Berne's mentor Julius Hemphill. Alongside Berne's regular band is featured guest David Sanborn, in an outlier among his more mainstream R&B work.

Reception
The AllMusic review by Scott Yanow said it was "This is certainly the most unusual David Sanborn recording to date. Avant-gardist Tim Berne (heard here on alto and baritone) and the popular R&B star Sanborn (mostly leaving his trademark alto behind to play sopranino) share a great respect for altoist Julius Hemphill and the St. Louis free jazz movement... they perform seven often-emotional Hemphill pieces plus Berne's "The Maze." Sanborn is to be congratulated for successfully stretching himself although this is very much Berne's date".

Track listing
All compositions by Julius Hemphill except as indicated
 "Sounds in the Fog" – 8:12   
 "Serial Abstractions" – 6:27   
 "Out, The Regular" – 5:54   
 "The Unknown" – 6:50   
 "Writhing Love Lines" – 7:20   
 "Rites" – 3:32   
 "The Maze (For Julius)" (Tim Berne) – 21:23   
 "Mystery to Me" – 6:30

Personnel
Tim Berne – alto saxophone, baritone saxophone
David Sanborn – sopranino saxophone, alto saxophone
Marc Ducret – electric guitar
Hank Roberts – cello
Joey Baron – drums
Herb Robertson – trumpet, cornet, flugelhorn (track 7)
Mark Dresser – bass (track 7)

References 

1993 albums
Tim Berne albums
JMT Records albums
Winter & Winter Records albums